Neu-Ulm is an electoral constituency (German: Wahlkreis) represented in the Bundestag. It elects one member via first-past-the-post voting. Under the current constituency numbering system, it is designated as constituency 255. It is located in southwestern Bavaria, comprising the Günzburg district, Neu-Ulm district, and the northwestern part of the Unterallgäu district.

Neu-Ulm was created for the inaugural 1949 federal election. Since 2021, it has been represented by Alexander Engelhard of the Christian Social Union (CSU).

Geography
Neu-Ulm is located in southwestern Bavaria. As of the 2021 federal election, it comprises the districts of Günzburg and Neu-Ulm as well as the Verwaltungsgemeinschaften of Babenhausen, Boos, Erkheim, and Pfaffenhausen from the Unterallgäu district.

History
Neu-Ulm was created in 1949, then known as Dillingen. It acquired its current name in the 1965 election. In the 1949 election, it was Bavaria constituency 43 in the numbering system. In the 1953 through 1961 elections, it was number 238. In the 1965 through 1998 elections, it was number 241. In the 2002 and 2005 elections, it was number 256. Since the 2009 election, it has been number 255.

Originally, the constituency comprised the independent cities of Neu-Ulm, Dillingen an der Donau, and Günzburg and the districts of Landkreis Neu-Ulm, Landkreis Dillingen an der Donau, and Landkreis Günzburg. In the 1965 through 1972 elections, it lost the city and district of Dillingen an der Donau while gaining the districts of Illertissen and Krumbach. In the 1976 through 1990 elections, it comprised the districts of Neu-Ulm and Günzburg. It acquired its current borders in the 1994 election.

Members
The constituency has been held continuously by the Christian Social Union (CSU) since its creation. It was first represented by Hans Schütz from 1949 to 1965, followed by Leo Wagner from 1965 to 1976. Theo Waigel, leader of the CSU from 1988 to 1999, was representative from 1976 to 2002. Georg Nüßlein was representative from 2002 to 2021. Nüßlein resigned from the CSU in March 2021 and served as an independent for the remainder of his term. He was succeeded by Alexander Engelhard in 2021.

Election results

2021 election

2017 election

2013 election

2009 election

Notes

References

Federal electoral districts in Bavaria
1949 establishments in West Germany
Constituencies established in 1949
Günzburg (district)
Neu-Ulm (district)
Unterallgäu